Chenebier is a commune in the Haute-Saône department in the region of Bourgogne-Franche-Comté in eastern France.

Around 739 inhabitants live there; they are called "Chenaillots" and "Chenaillottes". 
Chenebier is surrounded by other villages such as Chagey, Echavanne and Etobon. The closest town is Belfort (department of Territoire de Belfort) and is located 10 kilometers away (North-West).
The village lies at some 381 meters elevation and is close to the Ballon des Vosges Natural Park. The mayor is Francis Abry.

See also
Communes of the Haute-Saône department

References

Communes of Haute-Saône